Security-Widefield is a census-designated place (CDP) comprising the unincorporated communities of Security and Widefield located in and governed by El Paso County, Colorado, United States. The CDP is a part of the Colorado Springs, CO Metropolitan Statistical Area. The population of the Security-Widefield CDP was 32,882 at the United States Census 2010. El Paso County governs the unincorporated communities. Both the Colorado Springs post office (Zip Codes 80911, 80913, and 80925) and the Fountain post office (Zip Code 80817) serve the area.

History
The S.A. Wilson Elementary School in Security-Widefield is a school built in 1959-61.  It is listed on the National Register of Historic Places in 2017.

In 1991, Widefield was the site of the United Airlines 585 Crash, which killed all 25 persons aboard.  The crash was later determined to have been caused by a defect in the design of the Boeing 737-200's rudder power control unit.

Geography
East-west running Fontaine Boulevard divides Security-Widefield into two parts. Local convention usually regards Security as the section that is north of Fontaine Boulevard, with Widefield considered to be the southern section.

Demographics

Education
Students are served by the Widefield School District 3.

See also

Outline of Colorado
Index of Colorado-related articles
State of Colorado
Colorado cities and towns
Colorado census designated places
Colorado counties
El Paso County, Colorado
Colorado metropolitan areas
Front Range Urban Corridor
South Central Colorado Urban Area
Colorado Springs, CO Metropolitan Statistical Area
United Airlines Flight 585

References

External links

Security-Widefield @ UncoverColorado.com
Security Public Library
Security Water District & Security Sanitation District
Widefield School District
Widefield Parks & Recreation
Widefield Water and Sanitation District
El Paso County website

Census-designated places in El Paso County, Colorado
Census-designated places in Colorado